Playing God may refer to:

 Playing God (ethics), a core issue in ethics

Arts and entertainment
 Playing God (1997 film), a 1997 film
 Playing God (2012 film), a documentary film
 Playing God (2021 film), an American film
 "Playing God" (song), a 2009 song by Paramore
 "Playing God" (Star Trek: Deep Space Nine), an episode of Star Trek: Deep Space Nine
 Playing God, a song by Bullet for My Valentine from the deluxe edition of the 2015 album Venom
 Playing God, a 2012 album from Isgaard
 Playing Gods, a board game making light of religion